Shorea mujongensis is a species of tree in the family Dipterocarpaceae. It is endemic to Borneo.

References

mujongensis
Endemic flora of Borneo
Trees of Borneo
Flora of Sarawak
Taxonomy articles created by Polbot